Pesticide incidents in the San Joaquin Valley is a topic covering the justice and health issues of people living in the San Joaquin Valley resulting from the use of pesticides in the region. Pesticide use in the San Joaquin Valley began in the 1880s when certain insects were known to be causing harm in the region, much of whose economy is still based on the successful agriculture and farming of many different kinds of crops. Pesticides illnesses were reported sporadically during that time frame, but was not focused as a major issue until the post World War II agricultural boom in the late 1940s when pesticide poisonings became more widely publicized. Though Rachel Carson's Silent Spring and the use of chemicals in weapons during the Vietnam War led the federal government to pass restrictions on pesticide use, residents, primarily of low-income, have struggled with health impacts of pesticide use due to persistent over-spraying by agriculture companies working for profit.

Background 
California is a state where the production of agriculture has been a key part of the economy and appeal, especially in the Central Valley since achieving statehood in 1850. Many farmers grew in the area because of its temperate climate with warmer elements for its latitude and advertisements showing the supposed quality of produce grown in this climate. However, insects harming growing crop supplies, would soon become apparently problematic as early as the 1880s. Pesticides were introduced in the San Joaquin Valley around this time and by 1900 were regulated by a state cabinet, the Department of Agriculture. This department published incidents of pesticide poisonings and accidents as a record of occupational health in the workplace fields. Health as a whole, though at that time was focused on the Germ theory of disease as a whole rather than on the local environment, so pesticide poisonings were not seen as major issues back then. In the late 1940s however, a population boom after World War II, demanded more agriculture, and California was increasingly farming more crops like grapes to which its agriculture required more pesticides. By 1963, more than 16,000 different kinds of pesticide had been registered in the state. Reports of pesticide poisonings like a 1949 incident in the city of Marysville became more common. Silent Spring by Rachel Carson, published in 1962, encouraged public awareness on questioning the safety of pesticides, but major incidences of poisonings like 1963 and 1967 northern San Joaquin Valley peach farmers had continued. Awareness about the dangers of pesticides led to the formation of the United Farm Workers movement in 1964. Federal hearings on pesticide safety began in 1969 and safety laws began to be passed in the 1970s as well as the Delaney Amendment which prohibited carcinogens in food supply. This coincided with the shift of health now focusing on the local environment, once more. Yet today, pesticide health effects continue to be a problem for many people living in California's San Joaquin Valley.

Effects and response 
Pesticides in the San Joaquin Valley come with many different chemicals. These chemicals include DDT and organophosphates such as TEPP syntox, EPN, parthion, metam sodium, and methomyl. These chemicals can leak into the human body through direct contact by way of the skin including through the contact of plants that have contracted pesticide residues, overspraying of farm fields, inhaling pesticide residue in the air during pesticide drifts, and eating foods contaminated with pesticide residue. There are both chronic and acute effects from pesticide exposure that have been known to occur in the San Joaquin Valley. Observed chronic causes include birth defects, miscarriages, sterility, neurological effects, and child developmental impairments. Observed acute causes have been rashes in the eyes and on the skin. One study also showed ziriam containing pesticides were correlated with an increased risk of Parkinson's disease. Fish that make up food supply for many people were also found to be killed with certain mixes of OPs being more toxic than others when pesticide contaminated waters of the San Joaquin Delta were tested in a lab with titans. In specific incidences, dizziness and nausea were symptoms showing in a 1988 case in the southern valley town of Delano where 2 of the 54 farmworkers who fell ill went unconscious after a field was sprayed with methomyl. Pesticides were also a suspected cause in a cancer cluster affecting 13 children in the town of McFarland due to inhalation of chemicals between 1975 and 1988. Pesticide regulation has been difficult due to the power of companies that make money off pesticide use and fears of their prosecution or losing their support. When pesticide regulations were passed back in the 1970s, the United States federal government set laws setting tolerance levels on pesticide known to cause cancer sprayed on foods, but the EPA still authorized chemical testing that was not complete. After the McFarland cancer reports came in Governor George Deukmjian vetoed a bill requiring warning signs for pesticides in yards and farms in support of pesticide sprayers. In 1999, the town of Earlimart was hit with a pesticide drift from metam sodium drifting into fields. The sprayers were fined $150,000, but use of the dangerous chemical did not stop. There has also historically been racial prejudice in assessing pesticide concerns in the San Joaquin Valley. Many of the farmworkers who came to work in California fields were immigrants or braceros coming from Mexico and Latin America. Pesticide exposure was originally studied to be complex in which certain actions like wearing tons of protective gear would defend people against pesticide poisoning. Many of these bracero workers were directly sprayed and had little knowledge of the kinds of pesticides they were being exposed to. In addition, doctors would take up cases related to their pesticide concerns and diagnose it as heat stroke instead. This led people to believe the idea that immigrant workers’ own habits were contributing to them falling ill all of the time and not necessarily from the pesticide. Pesticide exposure in the San Joaquin Valley has continued to disproportionately affect low income farm families of color who make less than $10,000/year in income. Response to the issue has largely gotten attention by way of lawsuits such as one where since 2013, a San Joaquin County helicopter company called Alpine Helicopter Service repeatedly sprayed near a children's sports facility, and violations of the state's health and safety code were violated. Nonprofit organizations such as the Central Valley Air Coalition have also consulted with state and local agencies such as the Fresno County Farm Bureau on protects for residents against pesticide use, such as establishing buffer zones and finding alternatives to pesticides to protect crops.

Pesticide controversies

McFarland cancer cluster 1975-1996

From 1975 to 1996 McFarland California reported 21 of its children as being diagnosed with cancer which is “3 times” higher than normal considering the fact that McFarland had a population of around 8000 at the beginning of the Cancer Cluster.  As the reports of cancer cases began to increase locals pointed fingers at the pesticides which were commonly being used on farms in the area and soon after new outlets such as the LA Times began to take notice and started reporting on the incident. Because of the severity of the cluster and the amount of attention the cancer cluster was receiving, the U.S. Department of Health and Human Services (USDHHS) launched an investigation on the incident. The USDHHS performed a multitude of tests on households, surroundings areas, the air, and waterways but found nothing conclusive that could point at pesticides as being the cause of all the cancer incidents. Pesticide companies were quick to defend themselves after the report came out because as the report stated there was no indication that pesticides were at fault. This event remains controversial and many are still divided on whether or not pesticides played a bigger role that may have gone unnoticed despite the investigation by the USDHHS.

Alpine helicopter service incidents 2013-2019

Alpine Helicopter Service is a Lodi CA based company that sprays pesticides over large farm areas. From 2013 to 2020 Alpine had been directly involved in causing a multitude of pesticide drift incidents that ended up endangering the health of people in the area and created crop loss for nearby farms that the pesticides ended up damaging. In an especially controversial incident, a pesticide drift occurred while children were playing soccer at the Stockton Sports Complex (September 7, 2019) which put the health of the children and their families in danger. Many news outlets such as Capitol Weekly and The Record began reporting and identifying at least 11 separate pesticide drift incidents that Alpine was involved in. From a woman begin sprayed as the pesticide sprayer passed overhead to pesticide drift occurring over a schoolyard. As a result, in 2020 the California Department of Pesticide Regulation (DPR) and California's attorney general Xavier Becerra filed a lawsuit against the company which is still currently being investigated and processed. This incident is one of many pesticide drift incidents that has been recorded which are all being investigated by the DPR and reported on by various outlets.

Responses to pesticide usage

Medical journal research 
During the early 1960's and late 1970's, doctors and medical professionals from across the country conducted research in the Central Valley to better understand the effects of pesticides on the human body as well attempt to combat further incidents. A majority of this research was conducted on field workers who sought out medical attention for poisonings, since they had the most exposure to such pesticides than any other group of people.

Many doctors conducted their research on organophosphate pesticides, one of many forms of pesticide that specifically targets the Acetylcholinesterase enzyme. The intention of this research was to differentiate pesticide poisonings from other common diagnoses at the time, as well as further understand how what specific chemicals were harming the human body. Some of the most common insecticides that were causing poisonings were found to be Parathion, Phosdrin, Thimet, and Systox.  A large factor in this reason this research was conducted was due to the fact that it was difficult for doctors to diagnose a pesticide poisoning during this time. The symptoms of pesticide poisoning were to difficult to distinguish from other much more common diagnoses at the time. Due to the work and dedication of these doctors, pesticide incidents have been well documented and are distinguishable when diagnosed.

Scientific Findings and People's Responses to Pesticide Usage 
Civilians and government officials became more aware of the pesticide usage in the last century. Many studies were conducted in recent years to measure the levels and effects of pesticides in the Central Valley. Many of the findings stirred up community members in the Central Valley. Scientific data became useful for groups such as the UFW to push for stricter pesticide usage laws. Events such as the McFarland Cancer Cluster had a huge impact in that many people became more conscious of pesticides and its effect as a carcinogen. More recently, the state of California implemented policies to restrict certain types of pesticide that have been proven by researches to have many detrimental effects. Many environmental groups are continuing to work further to pass stricter laws regarding pesticide usage.

Scientific Findings 
Research by Environmental Toxicology and Chemistry has shown that pesticides enter the atmosphere through various methods. There were pesticide residues from the Central Valley found in places as far as the Arctic. Pesticide residues spread through water surfaces, wet deposition, and through the air mass. Although individual pesticide levels are below acute toxicity levels in the Central Valley, there are synergestic and additive effects of many pesticides that harm many sensitive species.

A more detailed study has been done in 2004 regarding the toxicity of pyrethroid in specific environments. Data collection showed that cumulative effects of various pyrethroids were responsible for 17 out of 23 samples used to measure toxicity. For instance, the most extreme cases were found in Tailwater ponds. There were 77 sedimentary samples used for data collection, and 42% of the samples had toxic levels of pesticides that caused the mortality of species of several Amphipods. Furthermore, data suggested that pyrethroid concentrations in the Central Valley were greater after their usage in agriculture compared to concentrations after heavy rains. This suggests that pesticide levels during irrigation season in places with greatest pesticide usage- Fresno, Madera, Stainslaus, Sutter- would be particularly detrimental to its residents and various species in the environment.

Political Response 

Recently, the California Department of Pesticide Regulation proposed rules to restrict Neonicotinoid chemicals, insecticides that harm bees that pollinate crops. Also, in 2024, all neonicotinoid in non-agricultural settings would be banned. This chemical is used throughout all the states for agriculture, but it is especially concentrated in the Central Valley. Fresno, Kern, Tulare, Monterey and San Joaquin are among the top counties of neonicotinoid usage. Now, the next step for environmentalists is to advocate for politicians to address crop seeds that are coated with neonicotinoids. Environmentalists have proved that these coated seeds still contribute significantly to the neonicotinoid mass, and that it is detrimental to honeybees.

The United Farm Workers have fought to improve farmworkers' working conditions, and have added pressure to politicians through their union marches. President Biden supported this by releasing Assembly Bill 2183, affirming that farmworkers have the fundamental right to gather and advocate for themselves regarding their workplace. Gavin Newsom followed up and enacted the law in California. With that being said, the Union has been struggling with gathering and organizing members. The Union however continues to serve as a powerful symolic representation. Both Gavin Newson and president Biden agreed that farmworkers should have an easy way to form a union. With support from many powerful politicians, the Union achieved to push through bills that regulate whether or not the farmworkers can work in the heat.

Civilians' Voices 
Following the McFarland Cancer Cluster in 1975, the small city in California never fully recovered from the effects of the pesticides. This is a city comprised mostly of farmworkers, and 94% of the population is Latino. The city leaders believed that the poor economy of the city is the blame for the Cancer Cluster. The majority of the residents wanted the federals to leave the town. Even after a decade or so after the incident, there were about 1 in 100 cases of cancer concentrated in this small community. Investigators started collecting data but nothing conclusive turned up. This inability to find a clear conclusion enraged the civilians. For instance, some people in the McFarland community complained that the investigations were incomplete. One civilian reported that there were no investigations of the deep soil or the air. A few others did not believe that the clusters even existed.

A more recent experience came from the Madera Community. One problem was that the orchards were planted just outside of residential neighborhoods, and the chemical spray often missed the leaves and ended up on people's homes. One civilian in the community reported that the noises of the machines and the dirt from the pesticide spray created a huge disturbance to the neighborhood's daily lives. Specifically in the town of La Vina, over 300 residents tried to leverage a new state policy to decrease the pesticide drift from the fields into the community. They reported to the state officials that the orchards were too close to the residential area, and that the pesticides resulted increased the chance of premature death. These residents have partnered up with local land and water agencies to allocate state funds to shut down farmlands. The La Vina residents also pointed out the effects of the carcinogenic compounds near their elementary schools. They have requested the United States Environmental Protection Agency to give them a $500,000 grant to perform chemical tests for safety measures.

References 

Environmental effects of pesticides
Health in California
San Joaquin Valley